Jordan McKinley Hicks (born September 6, 1996) is an American professional baseball pitcher for the St. Louis Cardinals of Major League Baseball (MLB). He was drafted by the Cardinals in the third round of the 2015 MLB draft, and he made his MLB debut with them in 2018.

Amateur career
Hicks attended Klein Oak High School in Klein, Texas, before transferring to Cypress Creek High School in Houston, Texas, for his senior year. He signed with Tulane University to play college baseball.

Professional career

Minor leagues

Hicks was drafted by the St. Louis Cardinals in the third round of the 2015 Major League Baseball draft out of Cypress Creek High School, and he signed with them for $600,000, forgoing his commitment to Tulane. He made his professional debut in 2016 with the Johnson City Cardinals of the Rookie Appalachian League and was promoted to the State College Spikes of the Class A Short Season New York–Penn League during the season. In 12 starts between the two teams, he was 6–2 with a 2.97 ERA.

Hicks started 2017 with the Peoria Chiefs of the Class A Midwest League, where he was named to the Midwest League All-Star game. He was promoted to the Palm Beach Cardinals of the Class A-Advanced Florida State League in July, with whom he was 0–1 with one save and a 1.00 ERA, and 32 strikeouts in 27 innings. Hicks finished 2017 with a combined 8–3 record and a 2.74 ERA in 22 games (19 starts) between the two clubs. After the season, the Cardinals assigned Hicks to the Surprise Saguaros of the Arizona Fall League (AFL), where he was selected to the Fall Stars Game.

St. Louis Cardinals

2018
Hicks was a non-roster invitee to 2018 spring training. He made St. Louis' Opening Day roster despite not having ever pitched above Class A-Advanced. He pitched one scoreless inning in which he earned his first strikeout against Jay Bruce. On April 21, Hicks earned his first major league win when he pitched the final  innings—all scoreless—versus the Cincinnati Reds to help seal a 4–3 victory.

He shares this record with Aroldis Chapman. He continued to garner attention throughout the season as one of the hardest throwing pitchers in MLB. Hicks finished his 2018 rookie campaign with a 3–4 record with six saves, a 3.59 ERA, and a 1.34 WHIP, striking out 70 batters in  relief innings.

2019
Hicks began the 2019 season as St. Louis' closer. On June 22, 2019, Hicks was removed from a game with elbow irritation and discomfort, and was originally diagnosed with triceps tendinitis. On June 24, it was revealed he had a torn ulnar collateral ligament in his right elbow. On June 25, 2019, Hicks opted to have Tommy John surgery on his right elbow, putting him out for the rest of the 2019. He officially underwent the surgery on June 26. For the 2019 season, Hicks compiled a 2–2 record with 14 saves and a 3.14 ERA, striking out 31 batters in  innings.

2020
On July 13, 2020, Hicks, who has Type 1 diabetes, announced he would be skipping the 2020 season due to the COVID-19 pandemic.

2021
On March 14, 2021, Hicks was involved in a 22-pitch at-bat during a spring training game against the New York Mets. Mets shortstop Luis Guillorme fouled off 16 pitches before ultimately drawing a walk. This is, to date, the longest at-bat in terms of number of pitches in Major League History.

In early May, Hicks was placed on the injured list due to inflammation in his right elbow. On May 14, Hicks was transferred to the 60-day injured list. He made two rehab starts, but did not make an appearance for the Cardinals for the rest of the season. He was selected to play in the Arizona Fall League for the Glendale Desert Dogs after the season.

2022
Hicks signed a one-year, $937,500 contract with the Cardinals to avoid salary arbitration on March 22. On April 6, one day before Opening Day, the Cardinals announced that Hicks would be the team's fifth starter in the absence of Jack Flaherty.

2023
On January 13, 2023, Hicks agreed to a one-year, $1.8375 million contract with the Cardinals, avoiding salary arbitration.

Pitching style
Hicks is one of the hardest throwers in the major leagues, and has been clocked as throwing as hard as 105 miles per hour. At the start of his professional baseball career, his pitch velocity was inconsistent and he had various mechanical issues. While pitching in an All-Star game, Hicks decided to throw as hard as he could, and reached 100 miles per hour twice. His velocity and overall mechanics began improving, and he continued pitching in the Arizona Fall League after the 2017 season ended, where he regularly threw 100 miles per hour and above.

Personal
Hicks was diagnosed with Type 1 diabetes when he was a junior in high school.

Hicks grew up a Houston Astros fan.

References

External links

1996 births
Living people
American disabled sportspeople
Baseball players from Houston
Major League Baseball pitchers
St. Louis Cardinals players
Johnson City Cardinals players
State College Spikes players
Peoria Chiefs players
Palm Beach Cardinals players
Surprise Saguaros players
Glendale Desert Dogs players
People with type 1 diabetes